The Chichijima incident (also known as the Ogasawara incident) occurred in late 1944.  Japanese soldiers killed eight American airmen on Chichi Jima, in the Bonin Islands, and cannibalized four of the airmen.

Incident 
Eight of the airmen, Lloyd Woellhof, Grady York, James “Jimmy” Dye, Glenn Frazier Jr., Marvell “Marve” Mershon, Floyd Hall, Warren Earl Vaughn, and Warren Hindenlang were captured and eventually executed. The ninth, and only one to evade capture, was future U.S. President George H. W. Bush, also a 20-year-old pilot.

After the war, it was discovered that the captured airmen had been beaten and tortured before being executed. The airmen were beheaded on the orders of Lt Gen. Yoshio Tachibana. Japanese officers then ate parts of the bodies of four of the men.

Trials 
Tachibana, alongside 11 other Japanese personnel, were tried in August 1946 in relation to the execution of U.S. Navy airmen, and the cannibalism of at least one of them, during August 1944. Because military and international law did not specifically deal with cannibalism, they were tried for murder and "prevention of honorable burial". 

This case was investigated in 1947 in a war crimes trial, and of the 30 Japanese soldiers prosecuted, four officers (including Lieutenant General Tachibana, Major Matoba, and Captain Yoshii) were found guilty and hanged. All enlisted men and Probationary Medical Officer Tadashi Teraki were released within 8 years.

Vice Admiral Mori Kunizo, who commanded Chichi-Jima air base at the time of the incident, was of the belief that consumption of human liver had medical benefits. He was initially sentenced to life imprisonment for his involvement in the incident. However, after his subordinates were convicted of slaughtering prisoners during their time on the Southern Front, he was sentenced to death and subsequently hanged in a separate trial organized by the Netherlands for war crimes committed in the Dutch East Indies.

Book 

In the best-selling book Flyboys: A True Story of Courage, American author James Bradley details several instances of cannibalism of World War II Allied prisoners by their Japanese captors. Bradley claims that this included not only ritual cannibalization of the livers of freshly killed prisoners, but also the cannibalization-for-sustenance of living prisoners over the course of several days, amputating limbs only as needed to keep the meat fresh.

See also
Japanese war crimes

References

External links
listing by name of seven of eight US POWS killed at Chi Chi Jima

Incidents of cannibalism
Imperial Japanese Army
Imperial Japanese Navy
Japanese war crimes
1944 in Japan
George H. W. Bush
Mass murder in 1948
Massacres in 1948
World War II prisoner of war massacres